Kristoffer Lindberg (born 1992) is a Swedish politician and member of the Riksdag, the national legislature. A member of the Social Democratic Party, he has represented Gävleborg County since September 2022. He had previously been a substitute member of the Riksdag for Patrik Lundqvist between November 2021 to December 2021.

References

1992 births
Living people
Members of the Riksdag 2022–2026
Members of the Riksdag from the Social Democrats
People from Östhammar Municipality